Lomax may refer to:

Places in the United States
 Lomax, Illinois, a village
 Lomax, Indiana, an unincorporated community
 Lomax, Nebraska, a ghost town
 Lomax, La Porte, Texas, a neighborhood

Entertainment
 Lomax (band), a British rock band
 Lomax, the Hound of Music, a children's television show on PBS
 Lomax, one half of drum and bass duo Loadstar

Other uses
 Lomax (kit car), a Citroën 2CV–based kit car, styled like a three-wheel Morgan
 Lomax (surname)
 Lomax distribution, used in business modeling
 The Adventures of Lomax, video game known as Lomax in Europe

See also
 
 Lomas (disambiguation)